Prajna Dutta is an Indian music composer, film maker and a martial artist. He has sung and composed many songs like Notun Abeshe, Golap, Rupkatha, Behala Bajajn etc. He has also directed films like Seesaw, The Sound Wanderer and Baaji.

Early life
Dutta studied screenplay writing and direction from Satyajit Ray Film and Television Institute, Kolkata. He has also learned Filipino martial art under the guidance of master Allan Fami.

Career
Dutta is an Indian music composer, film maker and a martial artist. He has sung songs like Notun Abeshe, Golap, Rupkatha, Behala Bajan, Akash Bhora Surjo Tara. He has also directed films like Seesaw, The Sound Wanderer, Pachar, Shei Framey, Baaji.

Filmography

Songs
 Natun Abeshe
 Golap
 Phire Eso Abar
 Behala Bajan
 Akash Bhora Surjo Tara
 Ja Jarey Ebar
 Ami Banglay Gaan Gai
 Love Aaj Kal Forever
 Bhalo Achi Bhalo Theko
 City Lights
 Ja Jare Ebar
 Gaanwala

Documentary
 Surer Simana

Films
 Baaji 
 Seesaw
 The Sound Wanderer
 Pachar
 Shei Framey
 Nandigramer Chokher Pani as a music director

References

External links 
 

Bengali singers
21st-century Indian singers
21st-century Indian male singers
Living people
21st-century Indian film directors
Year of birth missing (living people)

Singers from West Bengal